Julio Farías Cabello (born September 19, 1978 in Argentina) is an Argentine rugby union player. He plays as a lock or flanker. He made his debut against France, coming on as a replacement. He was then selected to start the game against Ireland the next week.

See also
Argentina Rugby Union

References

External links
UAR profile

1978 births
Argentine rugby union players
Living people
Argentina international rugby union players
Tucumán Rugby Club players
Pampas XV players
Rugby union locks
Rugby union flankers
Sportspeople from San Miguel de Tucumán